WJCV (1290 AM) is a radio station broadcasting a Southern Gospel format. It is licensed to Jacksonville, North Carolina.  The station is owned by Down East Broadcasting.

External links
FCC History Cards for WJCV 

JCV